Conspiracy of the Doomed is a 1950 Soviet drama film directed by Mikhail Kalatozov.

Plot 
A new state system In one country of Eastern Europe is being introduced, which causes discontent and resistance.

Starring 
 Lyudmila Skopina as Ganna Likhta (as L. Skopina)
 Pavel Kadochnikov as Maks Venta (as P. Kadochnikov)
 Vladimir Druzhnikov as Mark Pino (as V. Druzhnikov)
 Boris Sitko as Kosta Varra (as B. Sitko)
 Vsevolod Aksyonov as Sloveno (as V. Aksyonov)
 Luiza Koshukova as Magda Forsgolm (as L. Koshukova)
 Lyudmila Vrublevskaya as Mina Varra (as L. Vrublyovskaya)
 Ivan Pelttser as Steban (as I. Pelttser)
 Ilya Sudakov as Ioakhim Pino (as I. Sudakov)
 Sofiya Pilyavskaya as Khristina Padera (as S. Pilyavskaya)
 Aleksandr Vertinskiy as Cardinal Birnch (as A. Vertinskiy)
 Maksim Shtraukh as Mak-Hill (as M. Shtraukh)
 Vladimir Maruta as Gugo Vastis (as V. Maruta)
 Oleg Zhakov as Kurtov (as O. Zhakov)
 Valentina Serova as Kira Reychel (as V. Serova)
 Rostislav Plyatt as Bravura (as R. Plyatt)
 Ivan Bobrov as Yassa (as I. Bobrov)

References

External links 
 

1950 films
1950s Russian-language films
Soviet drama films
1950 drama films